Fujian red wine chicken is a traditional dish of northern Fujian cuisine which is made from braising chicken in wine lees made from red yeast rice (see lees (fermentation) ). This dish is traditionally served to celebrate birthdays and served with "long life" noodle misua.

See also
 List of Chinese dishes
 List of chicken dishes

External links
 Grandma's Ang Chow (Foochow Red Rice Wine)
 Red Glutinous Wine Lees
 Madame Huang's Kitchen

Chinese chicken dishes
Fujian cuisine